The following is a list of known convictions under the Terrorism Acts passed by Parliament of the United Kingdom since 2000.

Convictions by date

2003
Mohammed Abdullah Azam, convicted of "collecting information" related to terrorism in March 2003.

2004

2005
Saajid Badat, sentenced to 13 years' imprisonment for "conspiring to place a device on an aircraft in service". His co-conspirator, Richard Reid, was convicted of terrorism offences in the United States.
Tariq Al-Daour, sentenced to 6 years' imprisonment for "inciting another person to commit an act of terrorism wholly or partly outside the UK which would, if committed in England and Wales, constitute murder" and conspiracy to defraud banks and credit companies.
Waseem Mughal, sentenced to 7 years' imprisonment for "inciting another person to commit an act of terrorism wholly or partly outside the UK which would, if committed in England and Wales, constitute murder" and conspiracy to defraud banks and credit companies.
Younes Tsouli, sentenced to 10 years' imprisonment for "inciting another person to commit an act of terrorism wholly or partly outside the UK which would, if committed in England and Wales, constitute murder" and conspiracy to defraud banks and credit companies.

2006
Abu Hamza al-Masri, sentenced to 7 years' imprisonment for "possessing a document containing information likely to be useful to a person committing or preparing an act of terrorism". Hamza was extradited to the United States in 2012 to face further terrorism charges.

2007
Umran Javed, convicted of soliciting murder, sentenced to 6 years' imprisonment.
Abdul Muhid, convicted of soliciting murder, sentenced to 6 years' imprisonment. Convicted of further terrorism offences in 2008.
Mizanur Rahman, convicted of soliciting murder, sentenced to 6 years' imprisonment. Convicted of further terrorism offences in 2016.
Omar Altimimi, convicted of six counts of possessing computer files connected with the preparation or instigation of an act of terrorism under the Terrorism Act 2000,

21/7 bomb plot convictions
Muktar Said Ibrahim, convicted of conspiracy to murder, sentenced to life imprisonment with a minimum term of 40 years.
Hamdi Adus Isaac, convicted of conspiracy to murder, sentenced to life imprisonment with a minimum term of 40 years. Also known as Osman Hussain, Hussain Osman, or Hamdi Isaac.
Ramzi Mohammed, convicted of conspiracy to murder, sentenced to life imprisonment with a minimum term of 40 years.
Yasin Hassan Omar, convicted of conspiracy to murder, sentenced to life imprisonment with a minimum term of 40 years.
Adel Yahya, convicted of collecting information likely to be useful to terrorists, sentenced to 6 years and 9 months' imprisonment.
Manfo Kwaku Asiedu, convicted of conspiracy to cause explosions, sentenced to 33 years' imprisonment. Also known as George Nanak Marquaye or Sumaila Abubakari.

2008
Ibrahim Hassan, convicted of inciting terrorism overseas.
Abu Izzadeen, convicted of terrorist fundraising and inciting terror overseas.
Sulayman Keeler, convicted of terrorist fundraising and inciting terror overseas.
Abdul Muhid, convicted of fund-raising for terrorists.
Abdul Saleem, convicted of inciting terrorism overseas.
Rangzieb Ahmed, convicted of belonging to a proscribed organisation (namely Al Qaeda).
Habib Ahmed, convicted of belonging to a proscribed organisation (namely Al Qaeda).

21/7 bomb plot convictions
Wahbi Mohammed, convicted of assisting the plotters, sentenced to 17 years' imprisonment.
Siraj Ali, convicted of assisting the plotters, sentenced to 12 years' imprisonment.
Abdul Sherif, convicted of assisting the plotters, sentenced to 10 years' imprisonment.
Ismail Abdurahman, convicted of assisting the plotters, sentenced to 10 years' imprisonment.
Muhedin Ali, convicted of assisting the plotters, sentenced to 7 years' imprisonment.
Yeshi Girma, convicted of failing to inform the police about the plot, sentenced to 15 years' imprisonment.
Fardosa Abdullahi, convicted of assisting the plotters, sentenced to 3 years' imprisonment.
Esayas Girma, convicted of assisting the plotters, sentenced to 10 years' imprisonment.
Mulu Girma, convicted of assisting the plotters, sentenced to 10 years' imprisonment.
Mohamed Kabashi, convicted of assisting the plotters, sentenced to 10 years' imprisonment.

Transatlantic aircraft plot convictions
Ahmed Abdullah Ali, convicted of conspiracy to murder and conspiracy to murder using explosives on aircraft, sentenced to life with a minimum term of 40 years' imprisonment.
Tanvir Hussain, convicted of conspiracy to murder and conspiracy to murder using explosives on aircraft, sentenced to life with a minimum term of 32 years' imprisonment .
Arafat Khan, convicted of conspiracy to murder, sentenced to life with a minimum term of 20 years' imprisonment.
Assad Sarwar, convicted of conspiracy to murder and conspiracy to murder using explosives on aircraft, sentenced to life with a minimum term of 36 years' imprisonment.
Ibrahim Savant, convicted of conspiracy to murder, sentenced to life with a minimum term of 20 years' imprisonment.
Waheed Zaman, convicted of conspiracy to murder, sentenced to life with a minimum term of 20 years' imprisonment.

2009

2010

2011

2012

2013

2014

2015

2016
Anjem Choudary - On 5 August 2015, Choudary was charged with one offence under section 12 of the Terrorism Act 2000 for inviting support of a proscribed organisation, namely Islamic State, between June 2014 and March 2015. An expected trial date of 7 March 2016 was given, but the trial was postponed to 27 June 2016, and was expected to last no more than four weeks. Choudary was convicted on 28 July 2016.  At the Old Bailey on 6 September 2016, Mr Justice Holroyde sentenced Choudary to five years and six months in prison, telling him that he had "crossed the line between the legitimate expression of your own views and a criminal act".
Mizanur Rahman - On 28 July 2016, Rahman was convicted alongside Anjem Choudary of inviting support for a proscribed organisation, ISIS. Reporting restrictions were imposed on the conviction, preventing its publication until 16 August 2016. Rahman was sentenced to 5 years and 6 months imprisonment.

2018
Umar Haque, convicted 2 March 2018 at the Old Bailey London of a range of offences including plotting terrorist attacks, and collecting information useful for terrorism.  In addition, he tried to create a jihadist child army in London through his teaching (despite being not a teacher but only an administrator and having no teaching qualifications) at Ripple Road Mosque / Essex Islamic Academy and the Lantern of Knowledge school.

See also
21 July 2005 London bombings
2006 transatlantic aircraft plot
Terrorism Acts

References

Terrorism in the United Kingdom
Terrorism Acts in the United Kingdom
Terrorism Acts in the United Kingdom
Terrorism Acts in the United Kingdom
People convicted of political crimes